The Democratic Justice Party (DJP) was the ruling party of South Korea from 1981 to 1988.

History
Chun had become the country's de facto leader after leading a military coup in December 1979, and was elected president in his own right in August 1980. Two months after taking office, he abolished all political parties, including Park Chung-hee's Democratic Republican Party, which had ruled the country since 1963, and with few viable constraints on its power since Park's self-coup of 1971.  A new Constitution, which inaugurated the Fifth Republic, was enacted later in October.

The following January, Chun created the Democratic Justice Party, which garnered the support of most DRP lawmakers and politicians; for all intents and purposes it was the DRP under a new name. He was elected as the first president of the Fifth Republic in 1981. Although the DJP won large majorities at legislative elections in 1981 and 1985 and the system was heavily rigged in its favor, it had far less power than the DRP.

The 1980 Constitution limited the president to a single seven-year term, with no possibility of reelection. Chun announced his retirement in 1987, but resisted all calls to further open up the regime. The situation changed later in 1987, when DJP presidential candidate Roh Tae-woo promised that year's presidential election would be free and democratic. Roh became the first direct elected president under free and fair election in December 1987. In 1990, the DJP merged with Kim Young-Sam's Reunification Democratic Party and Kim Jong-pil's New Democratic Republican Party to form the Democratic Liberal Party.

Election results

President

Legislature

Notes

References

Conservative parties in South Korea
Defunct political parties in South Korea
National conservative parties
Far-right politics in South Korea
Political parties established in 1980
Political parties disestablished in 1990
Liberty Korea Party
Neoliberal parties
1980 establishments in South Korea
1990 disestablishments in South Korea
Right-wing parties
Right-wing politics in South Korea